Horatio Orlando Poulter (29 October 1877 – 30 August 1963) was a British sport shooter who competed in the 1912 Summer Olympics.

In 1912 he won the bronze medal as member of the British team in the team 30 metre military pistol event as well as in the team 50 metre military pistol competition. In the individual 50 metre pistol event he finished sixth.

References

External links
Horatio Poulter's profile at databaseOlympics

1877 births
1963 deaths
British male sport shooters
ISSF pistol shooters
Olympic shooters of Great Britain
Shooters at the 1912 Summer Olympics
Olympic bronze medallists for Great Britain
Olympic medalists in shooting
Medalists at the 1912 Summer Olympics
20th-century British people